Utricularia inaequalis is an annual terrestrial carnivorous plant that belongs to the genus Utricularia (family Lentibulariaceae). It is endemic to the southwestern coastal region of Western Australia.

See also 
 List of Utricularia species

References 

Carnivorous plants of Australia
Eudicots of Western Australia
inaequalis
Lamiales of Australia
Plants described in 1844